Alison Bishop  may refer to:

 Alison Jolly (1937–2014), American primatologist
 Alison Lurie (born 1926), American novelist and academic
Alison Bishop, character played by Elizabeth Franz